Présence protestante is a France 2 religious programme that presents Christianity.  It has been produced since the 1950s broadcast every Sunday morning since October 9, 1955.

History

Présence protestante debuted on October 2, 1955 which was presented by Marcel Gosselin, under the leadership of Marc Boegner who was the president of the Protestant Federation of France. It was broadcast RTF, it was originally titled Émission protestante, then it renamed the Présence protestante based on a similar french-speaking Swiss program. The show was presented by Marcel Gosselin until being replaced by Jean Doman in 1980. 

Présence protestante deals with theology on French television from a Protestant perspective.

Since 1961 the television Catholic/Protestant clergy made an agreement that meant that Présence protestante was afforded 1 hour broadcasting time on Easter, Christmas.

Since the privatisation of French television channels in 1986, religious broadcasts are now broadcast on Antenne 2 (now France 2).

References

External links
 Official site
 

1955 French television series debuts
1950s French television series
Television series about Christianity
French-language television shows
TF1 original programming
France 2
Religious television series
Protestantism in France